Litigation risk analysis is a subset of decision tree analysis and is the application of decision tree analysis to litigation and lawsuits. It operates based on the idea that prosecutors do not prosecute all cases even if they have merit due to several factors such as economic considerations. This method can reveal the odds of winning a case or financial loss that a litigation would incur, especially if it is too great for the kind of offence involved or there is an imbalance between effort and need. With this tool, a prosecutor is in a better position to decide whether to pursue a case or offer a plea bargain if this is permitted.

Background 
Litigation risk analysis is a growing practice by lawyers, mediators, and other alternative dispute resolution (ADR) professionals. When applied in mediation settings, litigation risk analysis is used to determine litigated best alternative to negotiated agreement (BATNA) and worst alternative to negotiated agreement (WATNA) scenarios based upon the probabilities and possible outcomes of continuing to litigate the case rather than settle. The process of performing a litigation risk analysis by mediators has been hampered by the need for mediators to physically draw out the decision tree and perform calculations to arrive at an expected value (EV). However, there have been calls for more mediators to adopt the practice of performing such an analysis.

Process 
There are several models of litigation risk analysis. Many prosecutors, for instance, are increasingly turning to computer-assisted approaches such as decision-support systems, which are employed when conducting cost/benefits analysis and the evaluation of cost, risks of trial outcomes, legal fee arrangements, and so on. All these, however, share the goal of breaking down the complex legal proceeding into its basic parts and quantifying the risks and uncertainties entailed. A prosecutor can use this type of analysis when evaluating the type or the size of the case. It is employed for more complex outcomes such as case assessment, strategy decisions, and settlement analysis.

References

External links
Litigation Risk by Marc Victor
Arbitration and Mediation in International Business
Risk analysis in mediation
Litigation Risk Analysis Software: Eperoto, Litigaze

Risk analysis